Apogonia is a genus of scarab beetles.  Some are pests of durian trees.

References

Melolonthinae
Scarabaeidae genera
Insect pests of millets